These Solar System minor planets are the furthest from the Sun . The objects have been categorized by their approximate current distance from the Sun, and not by the calculated aphelion of their orbit. The list changes over time because the objects are moving in their orbits. Some objects are inbound and some are outbound. It would be difficult to detect long-distance comets if it were not for their comas, which become visible when heated by the Sun. Distances are measured in astronomical units (AU, Sun–Earth distances). The distances are not the minimum (perihelion) or the maximum (aphelion) that may be achieved by these objects in the future.

Trans-Neptunian objects are typically announced publicly months or years after their discovery, so as to make sure the orbit is correct before announcing it. Due to their greater distance from the Sun and slow movement across the sky, trans-Neptunian objects with observation arcs less than several years often have poorly constrained orbits. Particularly distant objects take several years of observations to establish a crude orbit solution before being announced. For instance, the most distant known trans-Neptunian object  was discovered by Scott Sheppard in January 2018 but was announced three years later in February 2021.

Noted objects
One particularly distant body is 90377 Sedna, which was discovered in November 2003. It has an extremely eccentric orbit that takes it to an aphelion of 937 AU. It takes over 10,000 years to orbit, and during the next 50 years it will slowly move closer to the Sun as it comes to perihelion at a distance of 76 AU from the Sun. Sedna is the largest known sednoid, a class of objects that play an important role in the Planet Nine hypothesis.

Pluto (30–49 AU, about 34 AU in 2015) was the first Kuiper belt object to be discovered (1930) and is the largest known dwarf planet.

Gallery

Known distant objects
This is a list of known objects at heliocentric distances of more than 65 AU.

<noinclude>

See also
 List of artificial objects leaving the Solar System
 Lists of astronomical objects
 List of Solar System objects by greatest aphelion
 List of hyperbolic comets
 List of trans-Neptunian objects

References 

2021
Trans-Neptunian objects